The scorpion kick, also known as a reverse bicycle kick or back hammer kick, is a physical move in association football that is achieved by diving or throwing the body forwards and then placing the hands on the ground to lunge the back heels forward to kick an incoming ball. Sports historian Andreas Campomar praises the maneuver as remarkable, noting that it "demonstrated that the spectacle had not died: that the game, in spite of its many flaws, could provide moments of glory that had little to do with just victory or defeat."

The move gets its name from the player's resemblance to a scorpion's tail while performing the kick.

Colombian goalkeeper René Higuita is attributed with the invention of this skill. One of his best known performances of the maneuver occurred at Wembley Stadium during a 1995 international friendly match between Colombia and England.

On top of the regular diving scorpion kick, there are also other variations such as standing scorpion kick and spinning scorpion kick, neither of which necessarily result in the hands being placed on the ground. Swedish forward Zlatan Ibrahimović is a notable exponent for the standing scorpion kick, while the Italian defender Giuseppe Biava is a notable exponent for the spinning scorpion kick.

References

Kick (association football)
Association football skills
Association football terminology